Adarsh Alphons (born July 4, 1984)  the founder of ProjectArt, is an American entrepreneur, philanthropist and artist. As of 2017, ProjectArt is the largest free art school for children in the US. In addition, he is the founder and CEO of Wardrobe, a peer-to-peer marketplace for the rental of luxury, designer, and vintage fashion.

Education 
Alphons got his BFA in 2006 from the Maryland Institute College of Art. Alphons attended Boston University and got his MS in Arts Administration in 2007 from there. In 2014, he was made a Community Scholar at Columbia University At the conclusion of his time there, he was invited to lecture at the Faculty Hall for their Speaker Series.

Artist 
Alphons claimed that art saved his life. In 1996, he created "Mother's Golden Hands", a painting he did based on his encounter with Mother Teresa. The painting focuses on her hands rather than her face. The painting was sold in London during Alphons's global exhibition in 1999. He painted another portrait of Mother Teresa for Pope John Paul II's visit and Holy Mass in New Delhi. Alphons is the son of Alphons Kannanthanam.

Philanthropy and awards
In 2015, Alphons was listed among 50 Biggest Philanthropists in the World by Town and Country Magazine. In 2015, he was named a CNN Hero., Later that year, he was selected a 40 Under 40 in Art Business the US by Apollo Magazine., and in 2015   he was chosen as a Global 40 Under 40 by that publication.  He was made Community Scholar at Columbia University.
In 2011, Alphons was featured by NY1 News as the New Yorker of the week.

References

External links
 
 

1984 births
Living people
American philanthropists
Boston University alumni
21st-century American painters